Katie John (1915May 31, 2013) was an Alaska Native advocate and cultural expert. John was a plaintiff in a court case against the United States challenging the denial of Native subsistence fishing rights, known throughout Alaska as "the Katie John case." She was instrumental in developing an alphabet for the Ahtna language and preserving the culture and traditional way of life of the Ahtna Athabaskan people.

Personal life and cultural knowledge 

Katie John was born in 1915 to parents Chief Charley Sanford and Sarah Sanford. John spent most of her life in the northern Wrangell Mountains, with her family traveling seasonally between Tanada Lake and the Batzulnetas village.

John grew up hearing multiple Athabascan languages and dialects. Her father spoke in the Lower Ahtna dialect and her mother spoke in the Upper Tanana dialect; John primarily spoke the Upper Ahtna dialect of Batzulnetas and Mentasta. She first learned to speak English at age fourteen when she was employed in a mine in Nabesna, Alaska.

At age sixteen she married Mentasta traditional chief Fred John, Sr., raising fourteen children and six foster children together. In 1932, the family moved from the Tanada Lakes area to raise their large family in Mentasta.

John taught the Ahtna Athabascan language in local school in Mentasta Lake. In the late 1970s, she was a leader in developing the first alphabet for the then unwritten language. Later she would collaborate on the first Ahtna Noun Dictionary and pronunciation guide to help teach and preserve the language.

John died May 31, 2013 at the Alaska Native Medical Center in Anchorage.

Fishing rights activism

The Alaska State Board of Fisheries closed subsistence fishing in the 1960s when the use of nets and fishwheels was disallowed. In 1984, John and Doris Charles requested permits to reopen subsistence fishing in the Native village of Baltzulneta, which were denied. That decision started a decades long fight in the courts to reclaim fishing rights for Native Alaskans. "The Katie John case," as it is widely known in Alaska, began with a lawsuit filed against the state of Alaska in 1985. The case, through its multiple iterations, was litigated by the Native American Rights Fund.

She and the other plaintiffs ultimately prevailed in 1994; the ruling opened all federal waters in Alaska to management priority for rural and Alaska Native residents for subsistence use. Despite multiple appeals, the ruling has been upheld.

Legacy and honors

John received an honorary doctorate of laws degree from the University of Alaska Fairbanks in 2011.

The Alaska Federation of Natives renamed their Hunter and Gathers Award to the Katie John Hunter-Fisher Award in 2013; this award recognizes an Alaska Native who exemplifies and preserves subsistence hunting, trapping and sharing, and the Native way of life.

Alaska Senate Bill 78 was signed into law in 2019, establishing May 31 as Katie John Day.

In 2020, USA Today named John one of the ten most influential women in the history of Alaska as part of its "Women of the Century" series.

See also
 Ahtna language

References

1915 births
2013 deaths
20th-century Native Americans
Alaska Native activists